The Journal of Thermal Biology is a peer-reviewed academic journal that publishes articles that advance knowledge about the ways and mechanisms through which temperature affects humans and animals. Topics of interest include behavioral and autonomic regulation of body temperature; mechanisms involved in acclimation, acclimatization and evolutionary adaptation to temperature; mechanisms underlying the patterns of hibernation, torpor, dormancy, estivation and diapause; and medical applications of hypo- and hyperthermia. The journal publishes both original research articles and review articles. The current editors are Christopher J. Gordon and Hans-Otto Poertner..

The journal is abstracted/indexed in EMBiology, BIOSIS, Cambridge Scientific Abstracts, Current Contents, EMBASE, INSPEC, SCOPUS, and other indexing agencies. The journal's SCOPUS Cite Score is 2.41, placing it at the top 5% of General Biological Sciences journals.

References

External links 
 

8 times per year journals
Biology journals
Publications established in 1975
Elsevier academic journals